Snoh Sheri Nowrozi (born Shahrzad Fooladi, 13 September 1987), better known by her stage name, Snoh Aalegra, is a Swedish singer based in Los Angeles. Her debut album Feels was released in 2017, followed by Ugh, Those Feels Again in 2019.

Life and career

1987–2008: Early life and career beginnings 
Aalegra was born on 13 September 1987, in Uppsala, Sweden to Persian parents hailing from the south of Iran. She grew up in Enköping, Sweden, moving there with her mother following her parents' divorce. They later moved to Stockholm. She began writing music at the age of 9.

In 2001, at the age of 13, Aalegra signed an artist development deal with Sony Music Sweden. She would ultimately leave Sony Sweden with no music being released.

2009–2013: Career beginnings as Sheri, First Sign 

In 2009, Aalegra began her musical career using the mononym Sheri. She released her debut single "Hit and Run" on 16 February 2009, with production by Andreas Carlsson. The single peaked at number 12 on the Swedish Single Charts. She released her second single "U Got Me Good" on 4 December 2009, reaching number 2 on the Swedish Single Charts.

On 6 April 2010, under the name Sheri, she released the studio album First Sign, on Universal Music Sweden. It features a cover of the 1984 song "Smooth Operator" by Sade, and the singles "Hit And Run" and "U Got Me Good".

She signed with No I.D.'s ARTium Recordings in 2013.

2014–2018: Debut as Snoh Aalegra, Feels 
In July 2014, she debuted her new name, Snoh Aalegra, and appeared on Common's tenth studio album, Nobody's Smiling, featuring on the song "Hustle Harder". She released her debut single, "Bad Things" featuring Common, in October 2014, and  her debut EP, There Will Be Sunshine, on 17 November 2014, through ARTium/Epic. The EP includes "Stockholm, Pt. II (Outro)" featuring Cocaine 80s.

In 2014, she became a protégé of Prince after he discovered her music and reached out to her. He mentored her until his death in 2016.

In February 2015, Aalegra said she had changed her legal name to Snoh Nowrozi. She added "Aalegra" to her stage name because it means "joyful" in Italian (changing the spelling of "allegra" to make it her own), and because there was already an artist named Snoh. On 11 February 2015, Aalegra released her first single as Snoh Aalegra, "Emotional", produced by RZA. She also appeared on Vince Staples' debut album, Summertime '06 in June 2015, providing vocals for the song, "Jump Off the Roof".

Aalegra released the EP Don't Explain on 8 April 2016, through ARTium Recordings, with features and production from James Fauntleroy, No I.D., Boi-1da, Christian Rich and DJ Dahi. The EP features a cover of the 1944 song, "Don't Explain" by Billie Holiday and Arthur Herzog Jr. John Mayer plays guitar on "Under the Influence", and the final track, "Chaos", was written by Sia. In 2017, she went on her first North American tour, in support of Daniel Caesar.

On 20 October 2017, Aalegra released her debut album, Feels, with features from Vince Staples, Vic Mensa, Logic, and Timbuktu. The album is a "nostalgic blend of soul and R&B" which she calls "cinematic soul".    Her single "Time" was sampled by Drake on "Do Not Disturb", the closing track on his 2017 mixtape More Life. On 12 September 2018, her single "Nothing Burns Like the Cold" produced by Christian Rich and featuring Vince Staples, was used by Apple for their iPhone XS announcement video and commercials.   In the fall of 2018, Aalegra headlined her first North American tour with support from Mereba and Leven Kali.

2019–present: Ugh, Those Feels Again and Temporary Highs in the Violet Skies 

In August 2019, Aalegra released her second album, Ugh, Those Feels Again, on ARTium Recordings. The album is considered to be a sequel to Feels, similar in mood and thematically. The album peaked at number 3 on the Billboard R&B Album Sales chart, number 6 on the Billboard Top R&B Albums chart, and number 73 on the Billboard 200 chart. The single "I Want You Around" reached number 1 on the Billboard Adult R&B Songs chart. She recorded the song "Wolves Are Out Tonight", produced by Swizz Beatz, for the soundtrack to the 2019 EPIX television series Godfather of Harlem. She released the video to her single "Whoa", starring herself and actor Michael B. Jordan, on 13 December 2019. In the fall of 2019, she headlined a European and North American tour, with support from Baby Rose and Giveon, and reached number 1 on the Bandsintown + Billboard Global Rising Artists Index.

In February 2020, NPR's Tiny Desk Concerts released Aalegra's performance where she sang "Love Like That", "I Want You Around", "Whoa", "Fool For You", and "Find Someone Like You".

On 9 March 2020, it was announced that Aalegra had signed a recording contract with Roc Nation/Universal Music Group with a partnership with her current label ARTium Records, and released "Dying 4 Your Love", her first single, through both labels on 10 July. She announced that she was working on her next album in an interview.

Aalegra was featured on "Last Time", on Giveon's second EP, When It's All Said and Done.

On 9 July 2021, Aalegra released her third album, Temporary Highs in the Violet Skies, on ARTium Records and Roc Nation. The album was preceded by singles "Dying 4 Your Love", released on 10 June 2020, and "Lost You", released 21 June 2021, which was produced by Maneesh and No I.D.. Aalegra began her Ugh, These Temporary Highs Tour in Manchester on 13 February 2022.

Artistry 
Aalegra cites James Brown, Michael Jackson, Whitney Houston, Prince, Brandy, Lauryn Hill, Missy Elliott, Robyn, and Mariah Carey as musical influences. She also credits film score orchestras and arrangements with influencing her sound. She has said she first fell in love with music when she was 7 and heard Whitney Houston's The Bodyguard soundtrack.

Personal life 
After briefly living in London, Aalegra has lived in Los Angeles since 2012. She speaks Farsi, Swedish, English and a little Spanish.

Awards

Discography

As Snoh Aalegra

Studio albums

EPs

Singles

Guest appearances

As Sheri 
Studio albums

Singles

Tours 
Headlining
 Feels Tour (2018)
 Ugh, A Mini Tour Again (2019)
 Ugh, These Temporary Highs Tour (2022)

Supporting
 Daniel Caesar – Freudian, a World Tour (2017)
 TIDAL X Brooklyn (2018)
 The Weeknd – After Hours til Dawn Tour (2022)

References

External links 

 
 
 
 

21st-century Swedish singers
21st-century Swedish women singers
Swedish rhythm and blues musicians
Women hip hop musicians
Women hip hop singers
Hip hop singers
Singers of Iranian descent
Singers from Stockholm
Swedish people of Iranian descent
Musicians from Uppsala
People from Enköping
Epic Records artists
1987 births
Living people
English-language singers from Sweden